Yuen Tun Ha is an area and a village in Tai Po District, Hong Kong. It is the ending point of Stage 7 and the starting point of Stage 8, of the Wilson Trail.

Administration
Yuen Tun Ha is a recognized village under the New Territories Small House Policy. It is one of the villages represented within the Tai Po Rural Committee. For electoral purposes, Yuen Tun Ha is part of the Tai Po Kau constituency, which is currently represented by Patrick Mo Ka-chun.

See also
 Tai Po River

References

External links
 Delineation of area of existing village Yuen Tun Ha (Tai Po) for election of resident representative (2019 to 2022)

Tai Po District
Villages in Tai Po District, Hong Kong